"The Loneliest Time" is a song by Canadian singer-songwriter Carly Rae Jepsen, featuring Canadian singer-songwriter Rufus Wainwright. The fourth single from Jepsen's sixth studio album The Loneliest Time, "The Loneliest Time" was released on October 7, 2022 by 604, Schoolboy, and Interscope Records. The song was written by Jepsen, Kyle Shearer, and Nate Cyphert, and produced by Kyle Shearer.

Critical reception

Rankings

Personnel

Vocals: Carly Rae Jepsen, Rufus Wainwright
Background vocals: Kyle Shearer, Nate Cyphert
Songwriting: Carly Rae Jepsen, Kyle Shearer, Nate Cyphert
Production: Kyle Shearer
Bass, Drums, Synthesizer: Kyle Shearer
Violin: Elizabeth Lamb, Emily Kohavi, Cassie Morrow, Avery Bright
Cello: Cara Fox

Strings arrangement: Cody Fry
Programming: Kyle Shearer
Engineering: Kyle Shearer, James Krausse, Jared Fox
Mixing: James Krausse
Mastering: Emily Lazar
Assistant mastering: Chris Allgood

Charts

References 

2022 singles
2022 songs
604 Records singles
Canadian pop songs
Carly Rae Jepsen songs
Interscope Records singles
Rufus Wainwright songs
Schoolboy Records singles
Songs written by Carly Rae Jepsen